The 1979 Imo State gubernatorial election occurred on July 28, 1979, in Nigeria. NPP's Samuel Onunaka Mbakwe won election for a first term to become Imo State's first executive governor leading and, defeating main opposition, NPN's Collins Obi, in the contest.

Sam Mbakwe emerged winner in the gubernatorial primary election. His running mate was Bernard Amalaha (Amalaha was disqualified after the election and Isaac Uzoigwe was appointed in his stead).

President Shehu Shagari In 1979  was handed the new civilian government.

Electoral system
The Governor of Imo State is elected using the plurality voting system.

Results
There were five political parties registered by the Federal Electoral Commission (FEDECO) to participate in the election. Samuel Mbakwe of the NPP won the contest by polling the highest votes, defeating NPN's Collins Obi.

References 

Imo State gubernatorial elections
Gubernatorial election 1979
Imo State gubernatorial election